Mirko Lang is a German actor, who has appeared in many different screenplays, television shows, as well as stage productions. Born in October 1978 in Bremen, Germany, he currently lives in Berlin. After doing his Abitur he started studying music and theatre in Hannover, where he also had his first appearances on stage. While still studying, he starred in several motion pictures including Engel and Joe (where he had a leading part) and Das Wunder von Bern, which was a popular German movie. He finished studying in 2002 and won a Talent Award for being the best talented young actor in Germany. Since then, he has been working as an independent actor.

Movie appearances 
Born Guilty (2005) 
Aeon Flux (2004)
 (2004)
Männer wie wir (2003)
Das Wunder von Bern (2002)
Engel and Joe (2001)

Theatrical appearances 

Shakespeare’s Was ihr wollt (2004–05)
Astrid Lindgren’s Brüder Löwenherz (2002–04)
Die Nibelungen (2002)
Winner & Loser (2001–05)

External links 

Mirko Lang - Official Site

Living people
German male stage actors
German male film actors
German male television actors
1978 births